Sargentes de la Lora is a municipality located in the province of Burgos, Castile and León, Spain. According to the 2004 census (INE), the municipality has a population of 196 inhabitants.

In 1963, a petroleum reservoir was discovered in Ayoluengo de la Lora, a town of the municipality. Since 1964, 17 million oil barrels had been extracted. The reservoir had been exploited by Chevron Corporation (until 1990), Repsol (until 2002) and Northern Petroleum.

Main sights

La Cabaña dolmen: Prehistoric megalith.

People from Sargentes de la Lora
Andrés Manjón (1846-1923): Catholic priest and educator.

See also
Páramos (comarca)
Valle del Rudrón

References

Municipalities in the Province of Burgos